Balearic warbler (Curruca balearica) is a typical warbler, genus Curruca. It is endemic to the Balearic Islands, apart from Menorca. It groups with the Marmora's warbler, Tristram's warbler and the Dartford warbler (Helbig 2001, Jønsson & Fjeldså 2006).

These are small, long-tailed, large-headed birds, overall very similar to their close relatives in the Dartford warbler group. Balearic warblers are grey above and pale grey below, adding a pinkish tinge. Adult males have darker patches on the forehead and between the eye and the pointed bill. The legs and iris are red.

These small passerine birds are found in open country with thorny bushes and heather. 3-5 eggs are laid in a nest in a bush. Like most "warblers", they are insectivorous.

References

Helbig, A. J. (2001): Phylogeny and biogeography of the genus Sylvia. In: Shirihai, Hadoram: Sylvia warblers: 24–29. Princeton University Press, Princeton, N.J. 
Jønsson, Knud A. & Fjeldså, Jon (2006): A phylogenetic supertree of oscine passerine birds (Aves: Passeri). Zool. Scripta 35(2): 149–186.  (HTML abstract)

External links
The Balearic warbler can be readily observed on this itinerary in Mallorca

Curruca
Birds described in 1820